Bilbohall Hospital was a mental health facility located to the west of Dr Gray's Hospital in Elgin, Scotland.

History
The hospital, which was designed by Archibald Simpson, opened as the Elgin District Asylum in 1835. It was extended by A & W Reid in the 1860s and a third storey was added in the 1880s. It became the Morayshire Mental Hospital in the 1920s and joined the National Health Service as Bilbohall Hospital in 1948. After the introduction of Care in the Community in the early 1980s, the hospital went into a period of decline and closed in April 1995. The buildings were demolished in the late 1990s.

References

Hospital buildings completed in 1835
Hospitals established in 1835
1835 establishments in England
1995 disestablishments in Scotland
Hospitals disestablished in 1995
Former psychiatric hospitals in Scotland
Defunct hospitals in Scotland
Hospitals in Moray